Kemel is a name. Notable people with this name include:

 George Kemel (born 1931), English rugby league football player
 Kemel Thompson (born 1974), Jamaican athlete
 Myrzageldy Kemel (1949–2020), Kazakhstani writer, politician and academic
 Philippe Kemel (born 1948), French politician

See also
 Kemel, Çanakkale